William Piper may refer to:
 William Piper (1774–1852), American politician
 William Piper (abolitionist) (1786–1870), African-American former slave, conductor on the Underground Railroad and husband of Amelia Piper
 William Adam Piper (1826–1899), American politician
 William G. Piper (1906–1976), American politician
 William T. Piper (1881–1970), American airplane manufacturer, founder of Piper Aircraft
 William T. Piper Jr. (1911–2007), American businessman, president of Piper Aircraft